The equipment of the United States Armed Forces includes: weapons, ammunition, vehicles, and attire.

Weapons

Vehicles

Fixed-wing aircraft

Rotary Winged-Aircraft/VTOL/VSTOL

Spacecraft

Land vehicles

Watercraft

Attire

Uniforms

Camouflage patterns

See also
United States Armed Forces
List of equipment of the United States Air Force
List of equipment of the United States Army
List of equipment of the United States Navy
List of equipment of the United States Coast Guard
List of equipment of the United States Marine Corps

References

 
 
United States Armed Forces